Pawlicki (feminine Pawlicka, plural Pawliccy) is a Polish surname. It may refer to:
 Bronisław Pawlicki (1925–2014), Polish field hockey player
 Piotr Pawlicki Jr. (born 1994), Polish speedway rider
 Przemysław Pawlicki (born 1991), Polish speedway rider
 Stefan Pawlicki (1839–1916), Polish priest and historian

See also
 

Polish-language surnames